Halystina simplex is a species of extremely small deep water sea snail, a marine gastropod mollusk in the family Seguenziidae.

References

External links
 To Encyclopedia of Life
 To World Register of Marine Species

simplex
Gastropods described in 1963